James De La Vega (1972) is a visual artist of Puerto Rican descent who lives in New York City. He is best known for his street aphorisms and muralist art.

Life
James De La Vega was born in East Harlem, the son of Jaime De La Vega and Elsie Matos, and graduated valedictorian  at York Preparatory School and attended Cornell University, where he graduated in 1994 with a Bachelor of Fine Arts. He is a former art teacher at York Preparatory School.

In 2003 De La Vega failed to win a primary for New York State senate while campaigning on healthcare access for Spanish Harlem residents. There have been difficult times for De La Vega. He got sick, and when his mother died, he lost his storage where he had merchandise, paintings, and many other items. His attitude has always been to keep going and continue his work.

Art
He was featured as a live action character in the episode "postcards from Buster" from the animated series Arthur, as "Dr. De La Vega" while Arthur and Buster toured New York City with their camcorder.

James De La Vega (aka De La Vega) is known as a community-inspiring artist. Those who come across his work know him primarily for his murals and sidewalk chalk drawings. His murals can be found mostly in East Harlem, and his chalk drawings may show up anywhere in Manhattan. His street drawings are usually accompanied by aphoristic messages such as "Become Your Dream." Legally, his outdoor work qualifies as graffiti, although many put them in a separate genre. James De La Vega was a recipient of a Joan Mitchell Foundation Painters & Sculptors Grant in 1999.

Artist James De La Vega was featured in MoMA PS1 Exhibit 100 Drawings in the spring of 1999 alongside other prominent contemporary artist such as Danica Phelps, Rob Pruitt, Amy Gartrell and Olav Westphalen.

Christie's auction house has featured some of his work, and fans were able to view his more intimate work in his East Village gallery until the location closed in 2010.

In 2011, De La Vega collaborated with Tory Burch to create a line of accessories that benefited the Tory Burch Foundation.

Street Art vs. Vandalism

In July 2003, De La Vega was charged with vandalism for a mural he painted on a blank wall in the Bronx. He was offered one year’s probation in exchange for a guilty plea, but he refused to say he caused “damage” to the property and thus sentenced to 50 hours of community service.l

Apple iPhone 5s Ad Campaign 
In May 2014, artist De La Vega filed a cease-and-desist letter to Apple, claiming their new ad campaign for the iPhone 5S uses his trademarked slogan, “You are more powerful than you think”.  Apple's usage of the slogan 'clearly misleads customers into believing De La Vega somehow supports, approves and/or endorses its products' it apparently adds.

References

External links
JamesDeLaVega.com
Slideshow of De La Vega’s murals

Living people
American graffiti artists
Cornell University College of Architecture, Art, and Planning alumni
University of Paris alumni
American people of Puerto Rican descent
1974 births
People from East Harlem
American expatriates in France